Kabala Parish was a rural municipality of Estonia, in Järva County. Before 1950, the parish belonged to Viljandi County. In 1990s, the parish was re-established. The parish was liquidated on 30 June 2005.

References

Järva County
Former municipalities of Estonia